Samuel Post Davis (April 4, 1850 – March 17, 1918) was a US journalist, politician, and historian.  Though primarily a journalist, Davis also wrote poetry, plays, short stories, and humorous sketches. A humorist, he was one of the writers from Nevada associated with the Sagebrush School.

He was born in Branford, Connecticut. With his Episcopalian priest father, Davis moved to New Jersey, and Wisconsin. His early journalism jobs were in Nebraska, Missouri, and Chicago. He moved to California with his father in 1872, and three years later Davis moved to Virginia City, Nevada. Davis became the editor of the Virginia Chronicle. In 1879, after the death of Henry Rust Mighels, owner and editor of the Carson City Nevada Appeal, his widow, Nellie Verrill Mighels Davis, became the publisher, and shortly thereafter, hired Sam Davis as her editor. She married Davis the next year, and he took over operations of the Nevada Appeal.

Davis also had a political career. He served as Deputy Secretary of State in 1895. He was elected Nevada State Controller in 1898 and again in 1902.  Five years later, he was appointed State Industrial and Publicity Commissioner.

Davis and his wife had two daughters. He is buried at Lone Mountain Cemetery in Carson City next to his wife.

Partial works
 Short Stories (1886)
 The Prince of Timbuctoo (1905)
 History of Nevada (1913)
 The First Piano in Camp ... A story. With an appreciation by Sam C. Dunham. With drawings by H. Fisk, etc. (1919)

Expernal Links
A Guide to the Papers of Sam P. Davis, NC587. Special Collections, University Libraries, University of Nevada, Reno.
A Guide to the 	Sam P. Davis Correspondence, NC197. Special Collections, University Libraries, University of Nevada, Reno.

References

1918 deaths
People from Carson City, Nevada
Journalists from Nevada
1850 births
People from Branford, Connecticut
American humorists
Writers from Nevada